Vicimitra is a genus of sea snails, marine gastropod mollusks in the family Mitroidea.

Species
Species within the genus Vicimitra include:
 Vicimitra prosphora Iredale, 1929
Species brought into synonymy
 Vicimitra subflava Kuroda & Habe, 1971 ;: synonym of Calcimitra subflava (Kuroda & Habe, 1971) (original combination)

References

External links
 Iredale T. (1929). Strange molluscs in Sydney Harbour. Australian Zoologist. 5(4): 337-352

Mitridae